Lalibela, regnal name Gebre Meskel (Ge'ez: ገብረ መስቀል ; 1162 – 1221), was a king of the Zagwe dynasty, reigning from 1181 to 1221. According to Taddesse Tamrat, he was the son of Jan Seyum and brother of Kedus Harbe. Perhaps the best-known Zagwe monarch, he is credited as the patron of the namesake monolithic rock-hewn churches of Lalibela. He is venerated as a saint by the Ethiopian Orthodox Tewahedo Church on 19 June.

Biography
King Lalibela was born in Bugna in 1162, at a town called either Adefa or Roha (it was later renamed Lalibela after him). A swarm of bees was said to have surrounded him at his birth, which his mother took as a sign of his future reign as Emperor of Ethiopia. Accordingly he was named "Lalibela", meaning "the bees recognise his sovereignty" in Old Agaw. Tradition states that he went into exile due to the hostility of his uncle Tatadim and his brother king Kedus Harbe, and was almost poisoned to death by his half-sister.

Rise to Power
Because Lalibela came to power during his brother's lifetime, Taddesse Tamrat suspects that he took the crown by force of arms.
Lalibela was backed by the nobles of the Amhara People in his power struggle against his brothers; after his victory he made Amharic Lessana Negus and installed Amhara nobles in the top positions of his kingdom.

Construction of Churches
Lalibela is said to have seen Jerusalem in a vision and then attempted to build a new Jerusalem as his capital in response to the capture of old Jerusalem by Muslims in 1187. As such, many features of the town of Lalibela have Biblical names including the town's river, known as the River Jordan. The city remained the capital of Ethiopia from the late 12th century and into the 13th century.

Details about the construction of his 11 monolithic churches at Lalibela have been lost. The later Gadla Lalibela, a hagiography of the king, states that he carved these churches out of stone with only the help of angels.
According to the narrative of the Portuguese embassy to Ethiopia in 1520-6, written down by Father Francisco Álvares and published in 1540, the Lalibelian priests claimed that the churches took 24 years to construct. They said that King Lalibela ordered this to be done. 

His chief queen was Masqal Kibra, about whom a few traditions have survived. She induced Abuna Mikael to make her brother Hirun bishop, and a few years later the Abuna left Ethiopia for Egypt, complaining that Hirun had usurped his authority. Another tradition states that she convinced king Lalibela to abdicate in favor of his nephew Na'akueto La'ab, but after 18 months of his nephew's misrule she convinced Lalibela to resume the throne. Taddesse Tamrat suspects that the end of Lalibela's rule was not actually this amiable, and argues that this tradition masks a brief usurpation of Na'akueto La'ab, whose reign was ended by Lalibela's son, Yetbarak. Getachew Mekonnen credits her with having one of the rock-hewn churches, Bet Abba Libanos, built as a memorial for Lalibela after his death.

Although little written material concerning the other Zagwe kings survives, a sizeable quantity concerning Lalibela's reign remains, besides the Gadla Lalibela. An embassy from the Patriarch of Alexandria visited Lalibela's court around 1210, and have left an account of him, and Na'akueto La'ab and Yetbarak. The Italian scholar Carlo Conti Rossini has also edited and published the several land grants that survive from his reign.

References

External links
 J. Perruchon. Vie de Lalibala, roi d'éthiopie: texte éthiopien et traduction française. Paris 1892. (Online version in Gallica website at the Bibliothèque nationale de France)

1162 births
1221 deaths
12th-century monarchs in Africa
13th-century monarchs in Africa
Zagwe dynasty
Emperors of Ethiopia
12th-century Ethiopian people
13th-century Ethiopian people